Cyclacanthina monosema is a moth of the family Tortricidae first described by Alexey Diakonoff in 1972. It is found in Sri Lanka.

References

Moths of Asia
Moths described in 1972